Irreligion is very uncommon in Lebanon, as Islam and Christianity are the predominant faiths. It is difficult to quantify the number of atheists or agnostics in Lebanon as they are not officially counted in the census of the country. The Lebanese Constitution guarantees the freedom of belief.  There is a great stigma attached to being an atheist in Lebanon, thus many Lebanese atheists communicate via the internet. It is difficult not to have your religion stated at birth, although a baby made history in doing so in 2014.

Lebanon's last official population census - taken in 1932 during the French Mandate of Greater Lebanon - states that 0% of the Lebanese population is atheist.  Consequently, none of the government's parliamentary seats are reserved for that share of the electorate.

Most modern estimates still do not include any atheist communities or districts in Lebanon.  

Atheists may not marry in Lebanon as marriage must be performed in either a Church or a Mosque. Publicly blaspheming God is punishable with a minimum of 1 month up to 1 year of prison time according to article 473 of the Penal Code of Lebanon. The exact wording of the clause is that "blaspheming God publicly" is illegal. In addition, disrespecting Christianity or Islam is punishable by a minimum of 3 years to a maximum of 6 years of jail time according to article 474 of the Penal Code.

Life in Lebanon is largely divided along sectarian lines. Schools, housing, and political parties are generally segregated along religious lines. For example, East Beirut and West Beirut are almost exclusively Christian and Muslim, respectively.  Muslims and Christians have different civil codes, meaning that the punishment for a crime and other civil procedure (like divorce) may be different for a Christian than a Muslim.

Irreligion in the Lebanese Government 

The Lebanese government is structured around the unofficial National Pact.  It is a multiconfessionalist government, meaning parliamentary seats are reserved for certain religious groups.  The Pact used data from the 1932 census, which counted 0 atheists in Lebanon.  Among other things, it stipulated that:

 The President is always a Maronite Catholic.
 The Prime Minister is always a Sunni Muslim.
 The Speaker of the House of Deputies is always a Shiite.
 The Parliament is always structured in a ratio of 6:5 in favour of Christians.

The 4th point of the Agreement was changed by the Taif Agreement (1989), and the parliament's new structure gave Muslims and Christians equal representation.  Although the new agreement used more recent data, it still gave no reserved seats for atheists in any governmental post.
While the confessionalist nature of the government was supposed to be temporary, it was expanded by future constitutional amendments and is still in full force today.

Student organisations

In recent years, there has been some calls by student groups for Lebanese society to become more secular.  One such group, "Laique Pride" (after the French concept of laicité) advocates for an end to the confessional government in favour of a secular one.  After   In 2011, they held a rally in Beirut on the 27 of February.

The university with the most student activists for secularism in the government is the American University in Beirut (AUB).  One of the organisations there is the Secular Club, which was set up after the 2008 conflict.  Its goal, according to former president Joumana Talhouk, is "“to create a political space where people from different social and sectarian backgrounds can unite under common principles.”  
Another example of student activism is the far-left Red Oak Club. According to former president Theresa Sahyoun, the Red Oak Club and the Secular Club managed to find “common ground” and endorse the August 2016 Martyrs’ Square protest organized by Laïque Pride.

Opposition to irreligion
The overwhelming majority of Lebanese people are against the removal of religion in the public/private sphere.  Both Christians and Muslims generally prefer to keep the Lebanese government divided along sectarian lines to increase their influence.

Following Ghadi Darwish being the first child born in Lebanon without a designated sect, the Sunni Grand Mufti of Lebanon issued a fatwa condemning civil marriage and calling the idea a "germ" in Lebanese society.

Rise of Irreligion

Despite being officially uncommon amongst the Lebanese Society, there are some estimates that claim that the Concept of "Religious Ignorance" exploded from 2004 when its percentage was 0.3% among Millennials, it is expected that this percentage rose to 35% by 2012 and it is expected to grow more and more, especially after the 2019 Secular Revolution in addition after the unprecedented decline in Religious Service Attendance.
The Concept of banning or suspending the Establishment of New Religious Congregations has been more common than ever since the beginning of the 2010s, like the Church of Saint Elijah in the Town of Helta in the Batroun County as well as the Mosque of Al Rahman in the Sunni District of Western Beirut which their Projects were suspended and it is likely that they will never be established in the Future, due to the lack of Worshippers.
The decline of Students in Religious Schools has been also a great sign of the Rise of Secularization in the Country, some Religious Schools banned Religious Classes, many Congregations from both Religions have been banned too, the number of Young People who are members of Religious Scout Orders is also on the decline.

List of notable non-religious Lebanese
 As'ad AbuKhalil
 Gad Saad
 George Hawi
 Ziad Rahbani
 Joumana Haddad
 Rabih Alameddine
 Rania Masri

See also
 Religion in Lebanon
 Secularism in Lebanon
 Freedom of religion in Lebanon
 Christianity in Lebanon
 Islam in Lebanon
 Demographics of Lebanon

References

Religion in Lebanon
Lebanon
Lebanon
Lebanon